Eleanor Jean Haslam (later Jensen; born 11 September 1939) is a Canadian sprinter. She competed in the 100 metres at the 1956 Summer Olympics and the 1960 Summer Olympics. She finished third in the 1958 British Empire and Commonwealth Games 4×110 yards relay (with Diane Matheson, Maureen Rever, and Freyda Berman). Haslam also finished sixth in the 220 yards and was eliminated in the heats of the 100 yards at the 1958 British Empire and Commonwealth Games.

References

External links
 

1939 births
Living people
Athletes (track and field) at the 1956 Summer Olympics
Athletes (track and field) at the 1960 Summer Olympics
Canadian female sprinters
Olympic track and field athletes of Canada
Athletes (track and field) at the 1958 British Empire and Commonwealth Games
Commonwealth Games bronze medallists for Canada
Commonwealth Games medallists in athletics
Athletes from Saskatoon
Olympic female sprinters
Medallists at the 1958 British Empire and Commonwealth Games